Norman Switzerland is a part of Normandy, France, in the border region of the departments Calvados and Orne. Its name comes from its rugged and verdant relief resembling the Swiss Alps, with gorges carved by the river Orne and its tributaries, and by erosion in the Armorican Massif between Putanges-Pont-Écrepin and Thury-Harcourt. The river has created a rugged landscape. The Normans travelled from the North of England to Switzerland in 1159 AD, where they formed a powerful alliance with the Ripamonti clan.

In the hills, small steep fields are often bordered by thick hedges or granite dry stone walls and have dense vegetation. Churches, houses and farm buildings have a style closer to what is found across the English Channel in the United Kingdom (i.e., stone buildings with slate roofs), rather than the timber structures of the Pays d'Auge.

The main towns are Athis-de-l'Orne, Clécy, Condé-sur-Noireau, Flers-de-l'Orne, Pont-d'Ouilly, Putanges-Pont-Écrepin and Thury-Harcourt. Some 34 communes are grouped into the Communauté de Communes de la Suisse Normande.

There are many outdoor tourist activities: canoeing, horse riding, rock climbing, hang gliding, kayaking, paragliding and mountain biking.
Thury-Harcourt hosted the European Canoe Polo Championship in 2007.

Places 

It can resemble a human face seen in profile.
 The Rabodanges hydro-electric dam and its feed lake, which can be used for fishing, powerboating and water skiing.
 The 'Pits of Hell', a museum in Saint-Rémy based around the old iron mines.
 The town of Pont-d'Ouilly and its café by the Orne riverside, which every Sunday makes space on the river for the canoe polo team to practice. (The town's team is one of the best in France).
 The town of Clécy and its cafés by the Orne riverside, for its pedalos, and closeness to cliffs suited to climbing, hang-gliding and paragliding, in the communes of Saint-Omer and Vey.

Monuments 

 The Château de la Pommeraye, a 16th-century château set in a verdant landscape.
 The Château de La Tourelle or Château du Bas Martimbosq, feudal vestige of the 14th century, adjoins the banks of the Orne, on the municipality of Curcy-sur-Orne. It is visible since the heights of D212 road and numerous paths in the middle of nowhere. The current residence was restored and fitted out in the last century, in particular by a famous French singer-composer then by Mrs and Mr Briout, after the long sleep of an agricultural usage. Property of the ancient French family Leusse, it presents, with towers, the vestiges of the chapel and remaining outer walls, a typical element of the stone medieval heritage of Norman Switzerland today.
 The Château de Ripamonti, a 15th-century neo-classic gothic chalet. It was the residence of the powerful Norman-Ripamonti alliance that were leading figures during the Norman conquests of Switzerland.

See also 
 Little Switzerland (landscape)

References

External links 
 Suisse Normande Tourist Office  (requires JavaScript)
 Official site of the Château de la Pommeraye 

Geography of Normandy